László Szabadi (born 30 July 1961) is a Hungarian former professional footballer who played as a striker. He made two appearances for the Hungary national football team.

Club career 
Szabadi played for Ferencvárosi TC between 1981 and 1986. He won two league silver medals with the team. From 1986 to 1989 he played for Vasas SC. In 1989-90 he played for K Beerschot VA in Belgium. In 1990 he returned to Vasas SC. In total, he played 194 league matches in the Hungarian top flight and scored 62 goals.

International career 
In 1988 Szabadi played twice for the Hungary national football team.

Honours 
 Nemzeti Bajnokság I: runner-up 1981–82, 1982–83
 Magyar Kupa: finalist: 1986

References 

Living people
1961 births
Hungarian footballers
Association football forwards
Hungary international footballers
Ferencvárosi TC footballers
Nemzeti Bajnokság I players
Belgian Pro League players
Vasas SC players
K Beerschot VA players
S.C. Eendracht Aalst players
SSV Jahn Regensburg players
Hungarian expatriate footballers
Hungarian expatriate sportspeople in Belgium
Expatriate footballers in Belgium
Hungarian expatriate sportspeople in Germany
Expatriate footballers in Germany